The Women's Marathon at the 1997 World Championships in Athens, Greece was held on Saturday August 9, 1997, with the start at 08:05h local time.

Medalists

Records

Final ranking

See also
 Women's Olympic Marathon (1996)
 1997 World Marathon Cup

References
 todor66
 athletix

Marathon
Marathons at the World Athletics Championships
World Championships
Women's marathons
World Championships in Athletics marathon
Marathons in Greece

nl:IAAF wereldkampioenschap marathon 1997